Coming Back Like a Song: 25 Hits 1941–47 is a 1998 compilation album of songs recorded by American singer Jo Stafford. The album was released by ASV on May 19, 1998.

Track listing

References

1998 compilation albums
Jo Stafford compilation albums